Events from the 1590s in Denmark.

Incumbents
 Monarch – Christian IV
 Steward of the Realm – Christoffer Valkendorff (from 1596)

Events

1591
 4 July – Christopher Perkins has his first audience with Christian IV after his appointment as British ambassador to Denmark
 Katholm Castle is completed on the Djursland peninsula.

1592
 23 May  Mariager is incorporated as a market town.

1593
 Arngrímur Jónsson publishes Brevis commentarius de Islandia, a Brief Commentary on Iceland

1594

 Giacomo Castelvetro visits Denmark

1596
 26 August – The coronation of Christian IV of Denmark.

Births
1593
 27 October – Christoffer Urne, statesman and landholder (died 1663)
1594
 29 December – Ove Gjedde, admiral (died 1660)
1598
 6 July – Kirsten Munk, royal spouse (died 1658)
 17 October – Jørgen Knudsen Urne,  statesman (died 1642)
 28 November – Ulrik of Denmark (1578–1624), statesman (died 1667)
1599
 18 April – Heinrich Holk, mercenary (died 1633)
 23 July – Stephanius, royal historiographer and professor (died 1650)
Unknown date
 c. 1590 – Hans Brachrogge, singer and composer (died c. 1638)

Deaths
1590 – Karen Kotte, merchant
 21 September 1592 – Povel Huitfeldt, governor (born c. 1520)
 8 October 1593 – Jacob Ulfeldt, diplomat and privy councillor (born 1535)
 29 June 1584 – Niels Kaas, statesman (born 1535)
 1584 – Erik Munk, officer and administrator

References

 
Denmark
Years of the 16th century in Denmark